Ashis Nandy (born 13 May 1937) is an Indian political psychologist, social theorist, and critic. A trained clinical psychologist, Nandy has provided theoretical critiques of European colonialism, development, modernity, secularism, Hindutva, science, technology, nuclearism, cosmopolitanism, and utopia. He has also offered alternative conceptions relating to cosmopolitanism and critical traditionalism. In addition to the above, Nandy has offered an original historical profile of India's commercial cinema as well as critiques of state and violence.

He was Senior Fellow and Former Director of the Centre for the Study of Developing Societies (CSDS) for several years. Today, he is a Senior Honorary Fellow at the institute and apart from being the Chairperson of the Committee for Cultural Choices and Global Futures, also in New Delhi.

Nandy received the Fukuoka Asian Culture Prize in 2007. In 2008 he appeared on the list of the Top 100 Public Intellectuals Poll of the Foreign Policy magazine, published by The Carnegie Endowment for International Peace.

Early life and education
Nandy was born in a Bengali Christian family at Bhagalpur, Bihar, in 1937. He is the eldest of three sons of Satish Chandra Nandy and Prafulla Nalini Nandy, and brother of Pritish Nandy. Later, his family moved to Calcutta. Nandy's mother was a teacher at La Martiniere School, Calcutta and subsequently became the school's first Indian vice principal. When he was 10, British India was partitioned into two sovereign countries – India and Pakistan. He witnessed the time of conflicts and atrocities that followed.

Nandy quit medical college after three years before joining Hislop College, Nagpur to study social sciences. Later he took a master's degree in sociology. However, his academic interest tended increasingly towards clinical psychology and he did his PhD in psychology at Dept. of Psychology, Gujarat University, Ahmedabad.

While a professed non-believer, Nandy identifies with the Bengali Christian community.

Academic career
Nandy joined the Centre for the Study of Developing Societies (CSDS), Delhi, as a young faculty member. While working there, he developed his own methodology by integrating clinical psychology and sociology. Meanwhile, he was invited by a number of universities and research institutions abroad to carry out research and to give them lectures.  He served as the Director of CSDS between 1992 and 1997. He also serves on the Editorial Collective of Public Culture, a reviewed journal published by Duke University Press.

Nandy has coauthored a number of human rights reports and is active in movements for peace, alternative sciences and technologies, and cultural survival. He is a member of the Executive Councils of the World Futures Studies Federation, the Commonwealth Human Rights Initiative, the International Network for Cultural Alternatives to Development, and the People's Union for Civil Liberties. Nandy has been a Woodrow Wilson Fellow at the Wilson Center, Washington, D.C., a Charles Wallace Fellow at the University of Hull, and a Fellow of the Institute for Advanced Studies in Humanities, University of Edinburgh. He held the first UNESCO Chair at the Center for European Studies, University of Trier, in 1994. In 2006 he became the National Fellow of the Indian Council of Social Science Research.

Professor Nandy is an intellectual who identifies and explores numerous and diverse problems. He has written extensively in last two decades. His 1983 book, titled The Intimate Enemy: Loss and Recovery of Self Under Colonialism, talked about the psychological problems posed at a personal level by colonialism, for both coloniser and colonised. Nandy argues that the understanding of self is intertwined with those of race, class, and religion under colonialism, and that the Gandhian movement can be understood in part as an attempt to transcend a strong tendency of educated Indians to articulate political striving for independence in European terms. Through his prolific writing and other activities supported by his belief in non-violence, Professor Nandy has offered penetrating analysis from different angles of a wide range of problems such as political disputes and racial conflicts, and has made suggestions about how human beings can exist together, and together globally, irrespective of national boundaries.

Works
Books
1978 – The New Vaisyas: Entrepreneurial Opportunity and Response in an Indian City. Raymond Lee Owens and Ashis Nandy. Bombay: Allied, 1977. Durham, NC: Carolina Academic P, 1978.
1980 – At the Edge of Psychology: Essays in Politics and Culture. Delhi: Oxford UP, 1980. Delhi; Oxford: Oxford UP, 1990.
1980 – Alternative Sciences: Creativity and Authenticity in Two Indian Scientists. New Delhi: Allied, 1980. Delhi: Oxford UP, 1995.
1983 – The Intimate Enemy: Loss and Recovery of Self Under Colonialism. Delhi: Oxford UP, 1983. Oxford: Oxford UP, 1988.
1983 – Science, Hegemony and Violence: A Requiem for Modernity. Ed. Ashis Nandy. Tokyo, Japan: United Nations University, 1988. Delhi: Oxford UP, 1990.
1987 – Traditions, Tyranny, and Utopias: Essays in the Politics of Awareness. Delhi; New York: Oxford UP, 1987. New York: Oxford UP, 1992.
1987 – Science, Hegemony and Violence: A Requiem for Modernity. Ed. Ashis Nandy. Tokyo, Japan: United Nations University, 1988. Delhi: Oxford UP, 1990.Traditions, Tyranny, and Utopias: Essays in the Politics of Awareness. Delhi; New York: Oxford UP, 1987. New York: Oxford UP, 1992.
1988 – Science, Hegemony and Violence: A Requiem for Modernity. Ed. Ashis Nandy. Tokyo, Japan: United Nations University, 1988. Delhi: Oxford UP, 1990.
1989 – The Tao of Cricket: On Games of Destiny and the Destiny of Games. New Delhi; New York: Viking, 1989. New Delhi; New York: Penguin, 1989.
1993 – Barbaric Others: A Manifesto on Western Racism. Merryl Wyn Davies, Ashis Nandy, and Ziauddin Sardar. London; Boulder, CO: Pluto Press, 1993.
1994 – The Illegitimacy of Nationalism: Rabindranath Tagore and the Politics of Self. Delhi; Oxford: Oxford UP, 1994.
1994 – The Blinded Eye: Five Hundred Years of Christopher Columbus. Claude Alvares, Ziauddin Sardar, and Ashis Nandy. New York: Apex, 1994.
1995 – The Savage Freud and Other Essays on Possible and Retrievable Selves. Delhi; London: Oxford UP, 1995. Princeton, NJ: Princeton UP, 1995.
1995 – Creating a Nationality: the Ramjanmabhumi Movement and Fear of the Self. Ashis Nandy, Shikha Trivedy, and Achyut Yagnick. Delhi; Oxford: Oxford UP, 1995. New York: Oxford UP, 1996.
1996 – The Multiverse of Democracy: Essays in Honour of Rajni Kothari. Eds. D.L. Sheth and Ashis Nandy. New Delhi; London: Sage, 1996.
1999 – Editor, The Secret Politics of Our Desires: Innocence, Culpability and Indian Popular Cinema Zed: 1999. (also wrote introduction)
 2002 – Time Warps – The Insistent Politics of Silent and Evasive Pasts.
 2006 – Talking India: Ashis Nandy in conversation with Ramin Jahanbegloo. New Delhi: Oxford University Press, 2006.
 2007 – TIME TREKS: The Uncertain Future of Old and New Despotisms. New Delhi: Permanent Black, 2007.
 2007 – A Very Popular Exile. New Delhi: Oxford University Press, 2007.

Selected articles
 
 
 
 

Selected essays
Unclaimed Baggage, The Little Magazine
1982 – The Psychology of Colonialism: Sex, Age, and Ideology in British India. Psychiatry 45 (Aug. 1982): 197–218.
1983 – Towards an Alternative Politics of Psychology. International Social Science Journal 35.2 (1983): 323–38.
1989 – The Fate of the Ideology of the State in India. The Challenge in South Asia: Development, Democracy and Regional Cooperation. Eds. Poona Wignaraja and Akmal Hussain. Thousand Oaks: Sage, 1989.
1989 – The Political Culture of the Indian State. Daedalus 118.4 (Fall 1989): 1–26.
1990 – Satyajit Ray's Secret Guide. East-West Film Journal 4.2 (June 1990): 14–37.
1991 – Hinduism Versus Hindutva: The Inevitability Of A Confrontation
1993 – Futures Studies: Pluralizing Human Destiny. Futures 25.4 (May 1993): 464–65.
1994 – Tagore and the Tiger of Nationalism. Times of India 4 September 1994.
1995 – History's Forgotten Doubles. History & Theory 34.2 (1995): 44–66.
1996 – Bearing Witness to the Future. Futures 28.6–7 (Aug. 1996): 636–39.
1999 – Indian Popular Cinema as a Slum’s Eye View of Politics. The Secret Politics of Our Desires: Innocence, Culpability and Indian Popular Cinema. Zed: 1999. 1–18. (also editor)
 2000 – Gandhi after Gandhi after Gandhi (May, 2000)
 2002 – Obituary Of A Culture
 2004 – A Billion Gandhis
 2006 – Cuckoo over the cuckoo’s nest Tehelka
 2007 – What fuels Indian Nationalism? Tehelka
 2009 – The Hour Of The Untamed Cosmopolitan Tehelka; Partition And The Fantasy Of A Masculine State The Times of India

Awards
 Fukuoka Asian Culture Prize in 2007

Controversies
During the Jaipur Literature Festival held in January 2013, Nandy participated in a panel where he was quoted to have made controversial statements on corruption among "lower" castes in India. It was reported that he said,

Rajasthan Police lodged an FIR under the SC/ST Act against Ashis Nandy for his statement regarding corruption among the SC/ST and OBCs. After Nandy's lawyer moved the Supreme Court to quash all the allegations against him, the Court issued a stay order on his arrest on 1 February 2013. The subaltern scholar Dr. Satyanarayana has challenged Nandy's remarks and expressed shock at the vociferous support he received for this from the Indian media and academia, asking rhetorically, "Is Prof. Nandy a holy cow?".

Scholars say Nandy was at his satirical best when he made the comment but the sarcasm was lost on his detractors. They took this as an opportunity to attack him. But Nandy's sarcasm is well known in academic circles who were not surprised by the comment. In fact, he found support from academic quarters. Interestingly, three years later, in 2016-17, he received the KK Daomdaran Award from the Sree Narayana Mandira Samiti, Mumbai for his lifetime achievement as a scholar and intellectual, and for his contribution to the cause of the marginalised communities and castes.

Views on Narendra Modi 
In 2019, The New Yorker magazine reported: “During the dispute over Babri Masjid, Ashis Nandy began a series of interviews with R.S.S. members. A trained psychologist, he wanted to study the mentality of the rising Hindu nationalists. One of those he met was Narendra Modi, who was then a little-known BJP functionary. Nandy interviewed Modi for several hours, and came away shaken. His subject, Nandy told [the reporter], exhibited all the traits of an authoritarian personality: puritanical rigidity, a constricted emotional life, fear of his own passions, and an enormous ego that protected a gnawing insecurity. During the interview, Modi elaborated a fantastical theory of how India was the target of a global conspiracy, in which every Muslim in the country was likely complicit. ‘Modi was a fascist in every sense,’ Nandy said. ‘I don’t mean this as a term of abuse. It’s a diagnostic category.’”

Interviews
 Ashis Nandy in conversation with Gurcharan Das
 Ashis Nandy in conversation with Vinay Lal

See also
 Science and technology studies in India

References

Sources
Sardar, Ziauddin and Loon, Borin Van. 2001. Introducing Science. US: Totem Books (UK: Icon Books).

Further reading
 Cover Story: Polymath Of Our Times Tehelka 2 June 2012

External links
Ashis Nandy, Senior Honorary Fellow, Homepage at Centre for the Study of Developing Societies (CSDS)
Postcolonial Studies at Emory University: Ashis Nandy
 Ashis Nandy: A Short Biographical Note (2004), by Vinay Lal UCLA
Columns
 Ashis Nady Outlook

1937 births
Bengali people
Living people
Indian Christians
Indian institute directors
Indian male essayists
Indian psychologists
Indian sociologists
Indian critics
Cricket historians and writers
People from Bhagalpur
20th-century Indian essayists
Gujarat University alumni
20th-century Indian educational theorists
Scientists from Bihar
People from Bhagalpur district
Scholars from Bihar
Indian political writers
Political psychologists